"We Don't Play Guitars" is the first single from Chicks on Speed's album 99 Cents and features Peaches.  It was placed at #84 on the Triple J Hottest 100, 2003.

Critical reception 
Dan Lett of Pitchfork Media commented that the song "is a gutsy, rambunctious melee that puts mantra before message."

Music video 
The music video for "We Don't Play Guitars" was directed by Deborah Schamoni costumes by Chicks on Speed and Kathi Glas

Track listings 
German Vinyl, 12-inch single
 "We Don't Play Guitars (Chicken Lips Play Dub Version)" - 11:04
 "We Don't Play Guitars (Tiefschwarz Black Box Mix)" - 7:25

UK CD single
 "We Don't Play Guitars (Radio Version)" - 3:59
 "We Don't Play Guitars (Beat To The Drum Mix)" - 7:11
 "We Don't Play Guitars (Cristian Vogel Remix)" - 4:32

Song usage 
"We Don't Play Guitars" was included on the compilation albums FM4 Sound Selection 9 and Now 9.

Charts

References 

2003 singles
Electroclash songs
Peaches (musician) songs
2003 songs